Meghpur may refer to :-

Meghpur, Bhuj, a village in Bhuj taluka of Kutch, Gujarat
Meghpur, Anjar, a village in Anjar taluka of Kutch, Gujarat.
Meghpur, Jaunpur, a village in Jaunpur taluka of Uttar Pradesh